{{DISPLAYTITLE:Technetium (99mTc) exametazime}}

Technetium (99mTc) exametazime is a radiopharmaceutical sold under the trade name Ceretec, and is used by nuclear medicine physicians for the detection of altered regional cerebral perfusion in stroke and other cerebrovascular diseases. It can also be used for the labelling of leukocytes to localise intra-abdominal infections and inflammatory bowel disease. Exametazime (the part without technetium) is sometimes referred to as hexamethylpropylene amine oxime or HMPAO, although correct chemical names are:
(NE)-N-[(3R)-3-[[3-[[(2R,3E)-3-hydroxyiminobutan-2-yl]amino]-2,2-dimethylpropyl]amino]butan-2-ylidene]hydroxylamine
or 3,3'-((2,2,-dimethyl-1,3-propanediyl)diimino)bis-2-butanone dioxime.

Chemistry

The drug consists of exametazime as a chelating agent for the radioisotope technetium-99m. Both enantiomeric forms of exametazime are used—the drug is racemic.  The third stereoisomer of this structure, the meso form, is not included.

References

External links 
European Association of Nuclear Medicine: Ceretec
GE Healthcare: Ceretec
 Exametazime ligand: 

Radiopharmaceuticals
Ketoximes
Technetium-99m
Amines
Racemic mixtures